Yamen Zelfani (born 4 September 1979) is a Tunisian professional football manager. He was most recently the manager of Saudi Arabian club Al-Kawkab.

Managerial statistics

Honours
Nouadhibou
Ligue 1 Mauritania runner-up: 2015–16

Al-Merrikh
Sudan Cup: 2018

Dhofar
Oman Super Cup: 2019

Individual
Tunisian Ligue Professionnelle 1 Manager of the Month: April 2021, May 2021

References

External links
 
 

Living people
Tunisian football managers
Al-Merrikh SC managers
Dhofar Club managers
JS Kabylie managers
Tunisian expatriate football managers
Expatriate football managers in Sudan
Tunisian expatriate sportspeople in Sudan
Expatriate football managers in Oman
Tunisian expatriate sportspeople in Oman
Expatriate football managers in Algeria
Tunisian expatriate sportspeople in Algeria
Expatriate football managers in Saudi Arabia
Tunisian expatriate sportspeople in Saudi Arabia
Algerian Ligue Professionnelle 1 managers
Saudi First Division League managers
1979 births